The tovshuur, also known as topshur, topshuur or tovshuur is a two or three-stringed lute played by the Western Mongolian (Oirats) tribes called the Altai Urianghais, the Altais, Tuvans, and Khalkha peoples. 
The topshur is closely tied to the folklore of Western Mongolian people and accompanied the performances of storytellers, singing, and dancing.
According to descriptions given by Marco Polo, the Mongols also played the instruments before a battle.

Construction and design
All tovshuur are homemade and because of this, the materials and shape of the tovshuur vary depending on the builder and the region. For example, depending on the tribe, the string might be made of horsehair or sheep intestine.  The body of the tovshuur is bowl shaped and usually covered in tight animal skin. The Kalmykian tovshuur's form is more similar to that of the Kazakh Dombra

See also
 Tsuur
 Igil
 Doshpuluur
 Morin khuur
 Music of Tuva
 Music of Mongolia
 List of Mongolian musical instruments

References

Necked bowl lutes
Mongolian musical instruments
Altai musical instruments
Tuvan musical instruments